Zhong Lin Wang (born November 1961) is a Chinese-American physicist, materials scientist and engineer specialized in nanotechnology, energy science and electronics. He received his PhD from Arizona State University in 1987. He is the Hightower Chair in Materials Science and Engineering and Regents' Professor at the Georgia Institute of Technology, USA.

Education 

 Ph.D. in physics, Arizona State University, 1987.
 B.S. in Applied Physics, Xidian University, Xi'an, China, 1982.

He came to the US for graduate school through CUSPEA program organized by Tsung-Dao Lee.

Career 
Wang was a visiting Lecturer at Stony Brook University from 1987 to 1988. After working as a research fellow in the following year at Cavendish Laboratory in the University of Cambridge, Wang joined Oak Ridge National Laboratory and the National Institute of Standards and Technology as a research scientist from 1990 to 1994. He was hired by Georgia Institute of Technology as an associate professor in 1995; he was promoted to full Professor in 1999, Regents' professor in 2004, and the Hightower Chair in Materials Science and Engineering in 2010. Wang was the Director of the Georgia Tech's Center for Nanostructure Characterization from 2000 to 2015. He is the Founding Director, Director, and Chief Scientist at Beijing Institute of Nanoenergy and Nanosystems, Chinese Academy of Sciences since 2012.

Science and technology of nanogenerators 

Wang invented piezoelectric nanogenerators in 2006, for generating electricity from tiny mechanical energy offered by ZnO nanowire arrays. Since then, the areas of nanoenergy and self-powered systems were born, which have important applications in sensor networks, mobile electronics and internet of things.

Before the invention of triboelectric nanogenerators (TENGs) by Wang in 2011, the mechanical energy harvesting mainly relies on the electromagnetic generator (EMG) invented by Faraday in 1831. The EMG is most efficient for high-frequency mechanical motions, such as more than 10–60 Hz, because at a low frequency, the outputs of EMG are rather low. The high-quality and regulated energy at a high frequency plays important roles in constructing our today's energy system. However, the distributed energy becomes more and more important, because the era has marched into the internet of things and artificial intelligence. The TENGs have shown obvious advantages over the EMG in harvesting low-frequency mechanical energy from the environment. The energy conversion efficiency based on TENG can reach 50-85%. The maximum output power density obtained so far is up to 500 W/m2. The TENGs can harvest energy from many kinds of sources, and have important applications in self-powered systems for portable electronics, biomedicine, environmental monitoring, and even large-scale power.

Hybrid cell. In practice, the sustainable operation of device usually cannot be realized by scavenging only one type of energy. Wang introduced the hybrid cell in 2009 for simultaneously harvesting two or more different types of energy, such as solar and mechanical energy. Besides multiple types of energy, the hybrid cell also includes the case of using two different approaches to harvest the same type of energy.

Pyroelectric nanogenerator. Thermalelectric effect is a physical effect that applies the temperature gradient along a thermalelectric material to generate electricity. And in a piezoelectric material, the time variation of temperature can also cause the polarization for power conversion, which is the pyroelectric effect. In 2012, based on the pyroelectric effect, Wang invented the pyroelectric nanogenerator.

Blue energy. The TENGs have been proven to be capable of harvesting water wave energy at a low frequency. However, it is almost impossible using the traditional EMG technology. In 2014, Wang proposed the idea of blue energy, in which using millions of TENG units to form a TENG network floating on water surface for large-scale wave energy harvesting. If one TENG unit can generate a power of 10 mW, the total power for the area equal to the size of Georgia state and 10 m depth of water is theoretically predicted to be 16 TW, which can meet the energy needs of the world.

Theory of nanogenerators from the Maxwell's displacement current. In 1861, Maxwell proposed the term ε𝜕𝑬/𝜕𝑡 as the Maxwell's displacement current, leading to the unification of electromagnetic waves. The electromagnetic wave sets the foundation for wireless communication, radar and later the information technology. Wang added the second term 𝜕𝑃𝑠/𝜕𝑡 into the Maxwell's displacement current for the cases when the surface polarization is present, which represents the polarization introduced by non-electric field related effects such as piezoelectric and triboelectric effects. It is shown that the EMG is based on the time variation of magnetic field B, while the nanogenerator relies on the time variation of surface polarization field Ps. Recently, Wang fully expanded the Maxwell's equations for moving charged media, and introduced general solutions to the equations. This advance could be important for communications between flying objects.

Origins of contact-electrification. For decades, scientists have been debating about the charge identity and mechanisms of contact-electrification (CE, or triboelectrification), if it is due to electron, ion and/or materials species transfer. Recently, Wang concluded that electron transfer is the dominant mechanism for CE between solid-solid pairs. Wang proposed a generic model for the CE, and revealed that the electron transition between the atoms/molecules is induced by a strong electron cloud overlap (or wave function overlap) between the two atoms/molecules in the repulsive region, because the interatomic potential barrier can be reduced. The contact/friction force can enhance the overlap of electron cloud (or wave function in physics, bonding in chemistry). This model can be further extended to the cases of liquid-solid, liquid-liquid and even gas-liquid. Then, a hybrid layer model has been proposed to reveal the formation process of electric double layer between liquid and solid. The photon emission due to interface electron transfer and transition has been observed, resulting in the birth of the contact-electrification induced emission spectroscopy (CEIIS). Furthermore, the electron transfer between liquid and solid surfaces can be used for catalysis, resulting in a new field of contact-electro catalysis (CEC).

Energy for the new era and high entropy energy. When we enter the new era of internet of things, sensor networks, big data, robotics and artificial intelligence, billions of small, mobile and distributed energy sources are greatly required. Realizing the "self-powering" is imperative, due to the major disadvantages of batteries. Wang proposed the idea of "energy for the new era" in 2017 to distinguish the distributed energy sources from the well-known new energy. Recently, Wang studied the entropy theory of energy distribution and utilization for the era of internet of things. The "ordered" energy transmitted from power plants is used to solve the "ordered" applications for fixed sites and part of "disordered" distributed power applications, while the "disordered" energy harvested from the environment is mainly to solve distributed applications.

Piezotronics and piezo-phototronics of the third generation semiconductors 

Piezotronic effect and piezotronics. When applying a stress on a material with a non-centrosymmetric crystal structure, a piezoelectric potential (piezopotential) can be produced due to the ion polarization. For a ZnO nanowire, the Schottky barrier height between the nanowire and its metal contact can be effectively tuned by the created internal field. So that the charge carrier transport process across the interface can be effectively tuned and gated. Such phenomenon is called as the piezotronic effect, which was discovered by Wang in 2007. By applying the piezotronic effect, the piezoelectric field effect transistors, piezoelectric diodes and strain gated logic operations have been developed. The field of piezotronics represents the electronics in which the piezopotential acts as a gate voltage. Based on the piezotronics, the design of traditional CMOS transistor can be essentially changed. First, the piezotronic transistor can have no gate electrode. Second, an internal piezopotential displaces the gate voltage applied, and the applied strain is used to control the device instead of the gate voltage. Third, the contact at the drain (source)-nanowire interface controls the charge carrier transport instead of the channel width. Recently, the piezotronic effect in 2D materials was also demonstrated. The piezotronics could have important and wide applications in human-computer interfacing, smart MEMS, nanorobotics and sensors.

Piezo-phototronic effect and piezo-phototronics. When applying a strain, the piezopotential created by interface polarization charges can greatly tune the local band structure and shift the charge depletion zone at a pn junction. The separation or recombination of charge carriers at the junction can be effectively enhanced as excited by photon. Such phenomenon is called as the piezo-phototronic effect, discovered by Wang in 2009, in which the optoelectronic processes are tuned and controlled by the created piezopotential. By using this effect, the pressure/force sensor arrays based on individual-nanowire LED have been fabricated, which can map strain at a high resolution and density and greatly enhance the efficiency of LED. Such effect could find important applications in improving the performance of optoelectronic devices.

Piezophotonic effect. Wang theoretically predicted the piezoelectric-induced photon-emission effect (piezophotonic effect) in 2008. The photo emission can occur, resulting from the drop of trapped charges from the vacancy/surface states back to the valence band, under the existence of the piezoelectric potential. Such effect has been experimentally observed and verified in his later work.

Tribotronics. Similar to using a piezoelectric potential to control the carrier transport in a semiconductor device, the triboelectric potential can also be used as the gate voltage of a FET device. The field of tribotronics represents the electronics in which the triboelectric acts as a gate voltage. So far, different kinds of tribotronic functional devices, such as tribotronic tactile switch, memory, hydrogen sensor and phototransistor, have been fabricated.

Growth and understanding ZnO nanostructures 

Nanobelts are a new kind of 1D nanostructure formed by various semiconducting oxides having different cations and crystallographic structures. Wang discovered the oxide nanobelts in 2001. The ZnO has become a kind of material which has the equal importance to Si nanowires and carbon nanotubes.

In-situ nanomeasurements in TEM 

The characterizations of physical properties for carbon nanotubes, which are influenced by the sample purity and nanotube size distribution, are usually carried on by scanning probe microscopy. In 1999, a series of unique techniques were developed by Wang and co-workers based on the transmission electron microscopy (TEM) to measure the properties of individual nanotubes, including the mechanical, electrical and field emission ones. By using the in-situ TEM technique, one can directly observe the crystal and surface structures of the material at atomic-resolution, and also carry out nanoscale property measurements. Wang demonstrated a nanobalance technique and an approach toward nanomechanics.

Theory of inelastic scattering in electron diffraction and imaging 

Wang did some researches to understand the inelastic scattering in electron diffraction and imaging. He published a textbook on Elastic and Inelastic Scattering in Electron Diffraction and Imaging (Plenum Press, 1995)[27]. In scanning transmission electron microscopy (STEM), the high-angle annular dark-field (HAADF) (referred as Z-contrast) is dominated by the thermal diffuse scattering (TDS), which is revealed by Wang. And the dynamic theory for including TDS in image simulation of HAADF was proposed.

Honors and recognition 
Celsius Lecture Laureate, 2020, Sweden
Albert Einstein World Award of Science, conferred by the World Cultural Council (2019)
2019 Diels-Planck lecture award
2018 ENI award in Energy Frontiers 
American Chemical Soc. Publication most prolific author (2017)
Global Nanoenergy Prize (2017), The NANOSMAT Society, UK (2017)
Distinguished Research Award, Pan Wen Yuan foundation (2017)
Outstanding Achievement in Research Innovation award, Georgia Tech (2016)
Distinguished Scientist Award from (US) Southeastern Universities Research Association (2016)
Thomson-Reuters Citation Laureate in Physics (2015) 
Distinguished Professor Award (Highest faculty honor at Georgia Tech) (2014)
NANOSMAT prize (United Kingdom) (2014)
China International Science and Technology Collaboration Award (2014)
World Technology Award (Materials) (2014)
The James C. McGroddy Prize for New Materials from American Physical Society (2014)
ACS Nano Lectureship (2013)
Edward Orton Memorial Lecture Award, American Ceramic Society (2012)
MRS Medal from Materials Research Society (2011)
Purdy award, American Ceramic Society (2009)
John M. Cowley Distinguished Lecture, Arizona State University (2012)
NanoTech Briefs, Top50 award (2005)
Sigma Xi sustain research awards, Georgia Tech (2005)
Georgia Tech faculty outstanding research author award (2004)
S.T. Li Prize for Distinguished Achievement in Science and Technology (2001)
Outstanding Research Author Award, Georgia Tech (2000)
Burton Medal, Microscopy Society of America (1999)

References

External links 

 Wang's Research Group Website
 
 http://www.mse.gatech.edu/people/zhong-lin-wang/

1961 births
Living people
Chinese nanotechnologists
Chinese emigrants to the United States
Scientists from Shaanxi
Xidian University alumni
Arizona State University alumni
Georgia Tech faculty
American materials scientists
Engineers from Shaanxi
Albert Einstein World Award of Science Laureates
Foreign members of the Chinese Academy of Sciences
Fellows of the American Physical Society